Rihani (also Romanized as Rīḩānī) is a village in Nazil Rural District, Nukabad District, Khash County, Sistan and Baluchestan Province, Iran. At the 2006 census, its population was 36, in 14 families.

References 

Populated places in Khash County